Nichollsia is a genus of isopod crustaceans from India. It comprises two species:
Nichollsia kashiensis Chopra & Tiwari, 1950
Nichollsia menoni Tiwari, 1958

References

Isopod genera